The Seoul International Marathon, also known as the Dong-A Ilbo Seoul Marathon or Seoul Marathon is an annual marathon race that takes place in Seoul, South Korea. It is one of two annual races over the 42.195 km classic distance in the city, alongside the JoongAng Seoul Marathon which is held in November. It holds World Athletics Platinum Label Road Race status. First held in 1931, it is the third longest-running road running competition in Asia after the Hakone Ekiden and Chugoku Yamaguchi Ekiden in Japan.

The race has been integral to the elite level of the sport in Korea, as ten of the 28 South Korean national records in the marathon have been set at the competition. The day's races attract around 35,000 people on a yearly basis.

History
The genesis of the competition is traced back to the Youngdungpo Marathon, which was first held in 1931. The race was contested between fourteen of the country's top male runners and Seoul's Kim Eun-Bae won the first edition. Kim and the 1933 winner Sohn Kee-chung both went on to compete at the Olympic marathon, although they did so under the flag of Japan as Korea was part of the Japanese empire at that time.

This fact contributed to the suspension of the 1937 race: the event's sponsor, Korean broadsheet the Dong-A Ilbo, censored the Japanese flag in its reports of Sohn's marathon victory at the 1936 Berlin Olympics and the ruling Japanese military junta responded by suspending both the newspaper and the race. The race returned as an annual fixture from 1938 to 1940 but was again discontinued, initially due to World War II and later because of the Korean War. The race returned in April 1954 and Im Jong-Woo became the first person to win twice, taking back-to-back victories in 1954 and 1955.

The competition's first official full-length marathon was contested in 1964 and the change brought about improvements in the national standards as Lee Myeong-Jeong set a South Korea record to win in 1965 and Kim Bong-Nae became the first Korean to run under two hours twenty minutes a year later. At the 1970 edition, Canadian Ron Wallingford and two Japanese runners provided the race with its first international competitors. The quality of the field saw domestic runner Kim Cha-Wan react with a national record run of 2:17:34.4 to win the race. Kim improved his mark again in 1973 and went on to become the Dong-A Marathon's most prolific winner, scoring four victories in the 1970s. Japanese marathoner Toyoichi Masuda became the first foreign winner in 1977 and he was soon joined by his countryman Makoto Matsuzaki, who won two years afterwards. A women's 10 km race was added to the programme in 1979 and Moon Ki-sook became the first women's Dong-A champion.

Im Eun-Joo won a women's 30 km race in 1981 and female runners were allowed to take on the full marathon distance the following year. She went on to claim three straight marathon titles from 1983 to 1985. The 1982 race hosted a dual domestic and international race, with results kept separate for the divisions. In anticipation of the 1988 Seoul Olympics, the city also hosted separate international races from 1983 up to 1987 (which was the IAAF World Marathon Cup race). The Dong-A competition in the 1980s saw the men's record reach 2:12 territory through Jang-hee Lee in 1987.

With the advent of another decade, Won-Tak Kim brought the men's record down to 2:11:38 in 1990, winning the Asian Marathon Championship which was hosted within the race that year. Hwang Young-cho, Seoul's winner in 1991, went on to take the gold medal at the 1992 Barcelona Olympics. Kim Wan-gi reduced the national record further to 2:09:25 in 1993. The marathon was moved to Chuncheon for the 1992 event and had a seven-year stint in Gyeongju from 1993 to 1999. It returned to Seoul in 2000, but its impact in the latter city led to the creation of the Gyeongju International Marathon.

The event took on a more international nature from 1994 onwards, renaming itself the Dong-A International Marathon; following the invitation of runners from twelve countries, Manuel Matias of Portugal became the first winner from outside of Korea and Japan. The marathon reached a landmark of over 10,000 starters in 1999 as 11,303 runners signed up for the full distance in the elite and popular races.

China's Wei Yanan brought the women's record down to 2:25:06 in 2002, knocking over five minutes off the previous course best. Gert Thys had two consecutive victories in 2003 and 2004 (recording a record time of 2:07:06 in the latter), but a third win in 2006 was erased after he failed a drugs test for the banned steroid norandrosterone.  The runner-up Jason Mbote was declared the winner, but after a protracted legal battle Thys had his ban overturned in 2012 due to a breach of the rules in the way his sample was handled. At the 2002 edition, Zhou Chunxiu of PR China became the seventh woman to ever finish under two hours and twenty minutes as she set the women's record at 2:19:51 hours. Kenyan runner Sylvester Teimet beat the men's record in 2010 with his win in 2:06:49 hours. Three Kenyans went under this time in 2012, with Wilson Loyanae's time of 2:05:37 hours knocking more than a minute off the record.

The 2020 edition of the race was cancelled due to the coronavirus pandemic, with all runners receiving a full refund.

Course

The competition begins at Gwanghwamun Plaza in the city centre and finishes within the Olympic Stadium. The course has a point-to-point format and traces a south-easterly path through the city centre. After departing from the main plaza, the route flows into Sejongno thoroughfare and passes the statue of Yi Sun-sin. The runners then pass the Namdaemun gateway and head through Cheonggyecheon park. The route traces a pass through Dongdaemun-gu district before crossing the Han River to head towards the stadium finishing point.

Past winners

Pre-marathon

Key:

Note: All other years approx

Marathon

Key:

''In 1992, the race took place in Chuncheon, South Korea; and from 1993 to 1999, the marathon was run in the city of Gyeongju, South Korea

Notes
An international race and a domestic race were held simultaneously in 1982, with results being kept separately for each category.
 At the 2006 edition, Gert Thys was initially disqualified as the winner for a doping infraction. Second placed Jason Mbote of Kenya was considered the winner until 2012, when Thys had his ban overturned by the Court of Arbitration for Sport.

References

List of winners
Seoul International Marathon. Association of Road Racing Statisticians (2010-03-23). Retrieved on 2011-03-19.

External links

Official website

Athletics in South Korea
Marathons in South Korea
Sport in Seoul
Recurring sporting events established in 1931
Spring (season) events in South Korea